BBC Live & In-Session is a live album by the band Motörhead, released in 2005, which contains the band's appearances on the BBC Radio 1 program from 1978 to 1986 and a concert recording from the Paris Theatre, London in 1979. It is the second live album in North America and certain territories under Sanctuary Records and their subsidiary Metal-Is.

Track listing

Disc one

Disc two

Personnel
 Lemmy – lead vocals, bass - all tracks
 "Fast" Eddie Clarke – guitar, backing vocals - all tracks disk 1 & disk 2 tracks 1-5
 Phil "Philthy Animal" Taylor – drums - all tracks disk 1 & disk 2 tracks 1-5
 Phil Campbell – rhythm guitar & lead guitar, backing vocals - disk 2 tracks 6-10
 Michael "Würzel" Burston – rhythm guitar & lead guitar, backing vocals - disk 2 tracks 6-10
 Pete Gill – drums - disk 2 tracks 6-10

References

External links
Listen to samples of tracks from the album (CD Universe)

BBC Radio recordings
Motörhead live albums
Motörhead compilation albums
2005 live albums
2005 compilation albums
Sanctuary Records compilation albums
Sanctuary Records live albums
Heavy metal compilation albums
Live heavy metal albums